Leaney is a surname. Notable people with the surname include:

Aaron Leaney, Canadian saxophonist and composer
Edwin Leaney (1860–1904), English cricketer
J. Leaney, South African cricket umpire
John Leaney (christened 1790), English cricketer
Stephen Leaney (born 1969), professional golfer from Australia
William Leaney, English cricketer

See also
Laney (disambiguation)
Leney
Leny